Mohammad Zurab (also Romanized as Moḩammad Zūrāb; also known as Moḩammad Zūrā) is a village in Doruneh Rural District, Anabad District, Bardaskan County, Razavi Khorasan Province, Iran. At the 2006 census, its population was 122, in 27 families.

References 

Populated places in Bardaskan County